Anthidium montivagum is a species of bee in the family Megachilidae, the leaf-cutter, carder, or mason bees.

Distribution
It was discovered in Colorado.

References

montivagum
Insects described in 1878
Taxa named by Ezra Townsend Cresson